Christchurch Central is a New Zealand parliamentary electorate in the South Island city of Christchurch. The electorate was established for the 1946 election and, until 2011 had always been won by the Labour Party. Since 2008, the incumbent was Brendon Burns but the election night results for the  resulted in a tie; the special vote results combined with a judicial recount revealed a 47-vote majority for Nicky Wagner, the National list MP based in the electorate. Wagner significantly increased her winning margin in the  after having declared the electorate "unwinnable" for National earlier in the year following a boundary review.

Population centres

The 1941 New Zealand census had been postponed due to World War II, so the 1946 electoral redistribution had to take ten years of population growth and movements into account. The North Island gained a further two electorates from the South Island due to faster population growth. The abolition of the country quota through the Electoral Amendment Act, 1945 reduced the number and increased the size of rural electorates. None of the existing electorates remained unchanged, 27 electorates were abolished, eight former electorates were re-established, and 19 electorates were created for the first time, including Christchurch Central.

As the name suggests, the electorate covers the Christchurch Central City, plus several inner suburbs to the north and east of the central city. Since the 2008 election, the following suburbs, in alphabetical order, are at least partially located in the electorate: Avonside, Central City, Edgeware, Linwood, Mairehau, Merivale, North Linwood, Northcote, Papanui, Phillipstown, Redwood, Richmond, Shirley, St Albans, Sydenham, and Waltham. In the 2013/14 redistribution, the electorate lost Mairehau and Shirley to Christchurch East and gained more of Sydenham and Beckenham from Port Hills and more of Redwood from Waimakariri.

History
The Christchurch Central electorate was created in 1946. Labour held the seat for the next 65 years, though a high turnout for the Alliance saw Tim Barnett's 1996 majority come in at under a thousand. The incumbent, Brendon Burns, had a majority in the 2008 election of also just under one thousand.

The first representative was Robert Macfarlane, who had earlier represented the Christchurch South electorate. He was succeeded by Bruce Barclay, who died in office in 1979. This caused the  held on 18 August, which was won by Geoffrey Palmer. Palmer eventually went on to become Prime Minister.

Brendon Burns succeeded Barnett.

The election night results for the  resulted in a tie; Burns and Nicky Wagner of the National Party received 10,493 votes each. The outcome of the election thus depended on the special votes. This was the first time a tie result had been achieved since 1928. When the final vote count was announced on 10 December, Wagner was declared the winner with a majority of 45 over Burns, making the result the second-smallest majority after . Due to the closeness of the results a judicial recount was held where Wagner's majority increased by 2 votes to 47.

When draft electoral boundary changes were released, Wagner declared the electorate "unwinnable" for National. Although she was expected to not contest the 2014 general election, she announced at the end of January 2014 that she would try to defend her seat. Labour chose Tony Milne as their candidate for Christchurch Central. Wagner had a 2,420 majority over Milne. The Labour Party chose Duncan Webb as its candidate for the 2017 general election. He is a prominent lawyer and earthquake claims advocate. Webb narrowly won the seat in 2017, and massively increased his majority at the  amid that year's Labour landslide.

Members of Parliament
Christchurch Central has been represented by eight MPs. Since its creation in 1946 until the 2011 general election it had been a safe seat for the Labour Party. It was then held by the National Party until the 2017 general election when it swung back to Labour.

Key

List MPs
Members of Parliament elected from party lists in elections where that person also unsuccessfully contested the Christchurch Central electorate.

Election results

2020 election

2017 election

2014 election

2011 election

Electorate (as at 26 November 2011): 39,419

2008 election

2005 election

2002 election

1999 election

1996 election

1993 election

1990 election

1987 election

1984 election

1981 election

1979 by-election

1978 election

1975 election

1972 election

1969 election

1966 election

1963 election

1960 election

1957 election

1954 election

1951 election

1949 election

1946 election

Table footnotes

Notes

References

External links
Electorate Profile — 2005,  Parliamentary Library
Electorate Profile — 2008, Parliamentary Library

1946 establishments in New Zealand
New Zealand electorates
Politics of Christchurch